The Orinoco agouti (Dasyprocta guamara) is a species of rodent in the family Dasyproctidae. It is endemic to Delta Amacuro in Venezuela, where it is found in areas with rainforest or mangroves.

References

Dasyprocta
Rodents of South America
Endemic fauna of Venezuela
Delta Amacuro
Guayana Highlands
Mammals of Venezuela
Near threatened animals
Near threatened biota of South America
Mammals described in 1972
Taxonomy articles created by Polbot